Raggamuffin music, usually seen as ragga, is a subgenre of dancehall and reggae music. The instrumentals primarily consist of electronic music. Similar to hip hop, sampling often serves a prominent role in raggamuffin music.

Wayne Smith's "Under Mi Sleng Teng", produced by King Jammy in 1985 on a Casio MT-40 synthesizer, is generally recognized as the seminal ragga song. "Sleng Teng" boosted Jammy's popularity immensely, and other producers quickly released their own versions of the riddim, accompanied by dozens of different vocalists.

Ragga is now mainly used as a synonym for dancehall reggae or for describing dancehall with a deejay chatting rather than singjaying or singing on top of the riddim.

Origins
Ragga originated in Jamaica during the 1980s, at the same time that electronic dance music's popularity was increasing globally. One of the reasons for ragga's swift propagation is that it is generally easier and less expensive to produce than reggae performed on traditional musical instruments. Ragga evolved first in Jamaica, and later in Europe, North America, and Africa, eventually spreading to Japan, India, and the rest of the world. Ragga heavily influenced early jungle music, and also spawned the syncretistic
bhangragga style when fused with bhangra. In the 1990s, ragga and breakcore music fused, creating a style known as raggacore.

The term "raggamuffin" is an intentional misspelling of "ragamuffin", a word that entered the Jamaican Patois lexicon after the British Empire colonized Jamaica in the 17th century. Despite the British colonialists' pejorative application of the term, Jamaican youth appropriated it as an ingroup designation. The term "raggamuffin music" describes the music of Jamaica's "ghetto dwellers".

Ragga and hip hop music
King Jammy produced 1985 hit, "(Under Me) Sleng Teng" by Wayne Smith. In the late 1980s, Jamaican deejay Daddy Freddy and Asher D's "Ragamuffin Hip-Hop" became the first multinational single to feature the word "ragga" in its title. Their next single "Brutality" (1988) was a cover of Mungo Jerry's "In the Summertime".

See also
Reggae
Ska
Bouyon-muffin
Bhangragga
Jamaican Patois, the language of the distinctive vocals found in ragga

References

The world of DJs and the turntable culture By Todd Souvignier
 Stascha (Staša) Bader: Worte wie Feuer: Dancehall Reggae und Raggamuffin. Words Like Fire.  Dancehall Reggae and Raggamuffin. Dissertation Thesis at the Zurich University, 1986. Buchverlag Michael Schwinn, Neustadt, Deutschland, 1. Aufl. 1988, 2. Aufl. 1992
 René Wynands: Do The Reggae. Reggae von Pocomania bis Ragga und der Mythos Bob Marley. Pieper Verlag und Schott. 1995  (Pieper),  (Schott) Online-Version
 Norman C. Stolzoff: Wake the Town and Tell the People. Dancehall Culture in Jamaica. Durham; London: Duke University Press, 2000.

External links

 
Dancehall
Jamaican styles of music
Reggae genres